The Port of Kemi is a cargo port in the city of Kemi, Finland, on the northern shore of the Bothnian Bay.

The port comprises three facilities:
Ajos harbour: the main facility at Kemi, handling both containerised and bulk cargo; four piers and 11 berths with RO-RO and side loading; depth 
Veitsiluoto harbour: mostly used for the import and export needs of the adjacent Stora Enso papermill; seven berths; depth 
Oil terminal: two crude oil, one light fuel oil and one chemicals pipeline

The annual international cargo throughput of the Port of Kemi was  1.9 million tons in 2018, consisting of slightly more exports than imports.

References

External links

Kemi
Water transport in Finland
Kemi
Buildings and structures in Lapland (Finland)